Wahroonga is a suburb in the Upper North Shore of Sydney, in the state of New South Wales, Australia, 18 kilometres north-west of the Sydney central business district, in the local government areas of Ku-ring-gai Council and Hornsby Shire. North Wahroonga is an adjacent separate suburb of the same postcode .

History

Wahroonga is an Aboriginal word meaning our home, probably from the Kuringgai language group. In the early days of the British colonisation of New South Wales, the main activity was cutting down the tall trees which grew there. Wahroonga was first colonised by the British in 1822 by Thomas Hyndes, a convict who became a wealthy landowner.

Hyndes's land was later acquired by John Brown, a merchant and timber-getter. After Brown had cleared the land of timber, he planted orchards. Later, Ada, Lucinda and Roland Avenues were named after three of his children. His name is in Browns Road, Browns Field and Browns Waterhole on the Lane Cove River. The last member of the Brown family was Gertrude Mary Appleton, who died in 2008 at the age of ninety-three. She is buried in the cemetery of St John the Baptist Church, Gordon.

After the North Shore railway line was opened in 1890 it became a popular place for wealthy businessmen to build out-of-town residences with large gardens. Wahroonga Post Office opened on 15 October 1896. Much of this development occurred in the 1920s and 1930s.

Housing 

Wahroonga is known for its tree-lined, shady streets and well maintained gardens. Notable streets include Water Street, Burns Road, Iloura Avenue and Billyard Avenue.

Heritage listings
Wahroonga has a number of heritage-listed sites, including:
 9 Highlands Avenue: Highlands
 62 Boundary Road: Jack House, Wahroonga
 69-71 Clissold Road: Rose Seidler House
 61-65 Coonanbarra Road: St John's Uniting Church, Wahroonga
 16 Fox Valley Road: Purulia, Wahroonga
 69 Junction Road: Evatt House
 North Shore railway: Wahroonga railway station
 1526 Pacific Highway: Mahratta, Wahroonga
 1678 Pacific Highway and Woonona Avenue: Wahroonga Reservoir
 23 Roland Avenue: Simpson-Lee House I
 14 Woonona Avenue: The Briars, Wahroonga

Highlands, in Highlands Avenue, is a timber house designed by John Horbury Hunt and built in 1891 for Alfred Hordern. Hunt was a Canadian architect who used the Arts and Crafts style and the Shingle Style popular in North America. Highlands is listed on the New South Wales State Heritage Register and was listed on the (now defunct) Register of the National Estate.

Architect William Hardy Wilson designed and built his own home, Purulia, on Fox Valley Road. Built in 1913, the home is in the Colonial Revival style and became, according to some observers, a prototype for North Shore homes. It is listed on the Register of the National Estate.

Berith Park, in Billyard Avenue, was designed by F. Ernest Stowe for Alfred Smith, who bought the land in 1897. The house was finished circa 1909.

Westholme, in Water Street, was designed by Howard Joseland in the Arts and Crafts style for John Bennett, one of the pioneer developers of Wahroonga. Bennett came from England but migrated to Australia with his wife and acquired property at Wahroonga in 1893. Westholme was built in 1894. Another house was added at the other end of the block, but this was demolished in 1991 after changing hands several times.

The Gatehouse, in Water Street, was originally part of the John Williams Hospital. The hospital also includes the Federation mansion Rippon Grange, designed by Howard Joseland. The Gatehouse is listed on the local government heritage register.

Craignairn, at the corner of Burns Road and Cleveland Street, was also designed in the Arts and Crafts style by Howard Joseland. The client was Walter Strang.

Joseland also built his own home Malvern two doors away from the Strang home in Burns Road. An example of the Federation Bungalow style, it has been described as "unpretentious and solidly comfortable." Between Craignairn and Malvern in Burns Road, Joseland also built Coolabah, another fine Federation Bungalow example.

The Briars, in Woonona Avenue, is built on land that was granted to John Hughes in 1842, and later divided into four estates. Jessie Edith Balcombe built The Briars on one of these estates in 1895. It is listed on the New South Wales State Heritage Register.

The Rose Seidler House, in Clissold Road, built by Harry Seidler between 1948 and 1950, was one of the first examples of modern residential architecture in Australia.

Commercial areas
The main shopping and commercial area is the Wahroonga Village located adjacent to the west side of the railway station. It has a variety of stores including several cafes, restaurants, health stores and boutiques as well as an IGA supermarket.

The smaller commercial centres are the Hampden Avenue shopping strip in east Wahroonga, and Fox Valley Shopping Centre on Fox Valley Road in south west Wahroonga. 

There is also a commercial area at the intersection of Fox Valley Road and The Comenarra Parkway which contains the Sydney Adventist Hospital, Globalstar's Australian office, and the offices of the South Pacific Division of Seventh-day Adventists.

Transport
Wahroonga railway station is on the North Shore & Western Line of the Sydney Trains network, with frequent rail services to Central and Hornsby.

Wahroonga is the Sydney end of the M1 Motorway to Newcastle. The Pacific Highway connects Wahroonga by road with the rest of the North Shore and Pennant Hills Road’s northern end begins in Wahroonga and intersects the M1 Motorway at Pearce's Corner. The Comenarra Parkway is a minor arterial road that stretches from Thornleigh to West Pymble via Wahroonga and South Turramurra. Wahroonga is also the northern end of the NorthConnex motorway tunnel.

Transdev NSW’s Upper North Shore services provide sporadic bus services to parts of Wahroonga.

Parks
Wahroonga Park is located to the north-east of the railway station, and features a significant number of well established introduced trees, a rose garden and a children's playground. The Glade, located near Abbotsleigh, has an oval, two tennis courts, a half basketball court and cricket nets. There is also a small Blue Gum High Forest, next to the tennis courts. Browns Field is a small sporting oval, formerly a historic logging area. Sir Robert Menzies Park is a small park located within Fox Valley.

Ku-ring-gai Chase National Park is located north of Wahroonga. It is the second oldest national park in Australia and is very popular, offering many walking tracks, picnic spots and Aboriginal sites with rock carvings. The park has a large proportion of the known Aboriginal sites in the Sydney area.

Schools
Primary:
 Wahroonga Public School
 Waitara Public School
 Prouille Catholic Primary School
 Wahroonga Preparatory School
 St Lucy's School for children with disabilities

Secondary:
 St Leo's Catholic College 
 St Edmund's School for students with vision impairment and other special needs

K-12:
 Knox Grammar School 
 Abbotsleigh School for Girls
 Wahroonga Adventist School

Gallery

Population

Demographics
The most common countries of birth were England 5.6%, China 5.6%, South Africa 2.6%, India 2.2% and New Zealand 1.9%.  71.7% of people only spoke English at home. Other languages spoken at home included Mandarin (6.7%), Cantonese (3.1%), Korean (1.7%), Persian (1.2%) and Hindi (1.1%). The most common responses for religion in Wahroonga were No Religion 27.6%, Catholic 21.9% and Anglican 18.8%.

Notable residents

 Halse Rogers Arnott, medical practitioner, company director and chairman of Arnott's, lived on Burns Road
Dorothy ('Dot') Butler, bushwalker, mountaineer, and conservationist, lived in Boundary Road
 David Campese, former Wallaby
 Grace Cossington Smith, Australian artist and pioneer of modernist painting, attended Abbotsleigh School
 Clive Evatt, politician and barrister
 Nicholas Fitzgerald, football (soccer) player for the Brisbane Roar
 Martin Flood, Australian quiz champion
 Adam Garcia, actor
 Peter Garrett, frontman of 1980s band Midnight Oil and Member of the Australian House of Representatives for Kingsford Smith from 2004 to 2013 was born and raised here.
 Mel Gibson, actor, was educated by members of the Congregation of Christian Brothers at St Leo's Catholic College during his high school years
 Stuart Inder, journalist, editor and specialist in Pacific Islands affairs
 Hugh Jackman, actor
 Howard Joseland, architect, responsible for many of Wahroonga's finest early homes. 
 Richard Makinson, physicist 
 Ollie McGill, keyboardist and backing vocalist for The Cat Empire
 Ellyse Perry, Australian dual-international footballer and cricketer
 Jacob Preston, rugby league player
 Deborah Schofield, director of the Centre for Economic Impacts of Genomic Medicine, Macquarie University
 Natalie Tobin, association footballer player for Sydney FC
 John Toohey, founder of Tooheys Brewery and politician, lived at Innisfail, now part of Knox Grammar School
 William Hardy Wilson, architect, artist and author
 William Windeyer, justice of the Supreme Court of New South Wales and decorated soldier
 Harry Wolstenholme, lawyer and amateur ornithologist lived in Wahroonga

References

External links

  [CC-By-SA]
 Information on Wahroonga at Ku-ring-gai council's website
 Rose Seidler House
 Heritage Homes of Wahroonga
Rover Crews - for young people aged 18–25 - at nearby Turramurra & Kissing Point
  [CC-By-SA]

 
Suburbs of Sydney
1822 establishments in Australia
Populated places established in 1822